Matthew Ko Kwan-yin (born 20 May 1984) is a Hong Kong actor. In September 2014, Ko left TVB after his contract ended to later sign with Catchy Tone Artists in Mainland China.

At the age of seven, Matthew emigrated to Toronto, Ontario, Canada with his parents. He attended Dr. G.W. Williams Secondary School and played on the Wildcats Basketball team. He then entered York University. In 2003, he participated in the Toronto Sunshine Boyz election and won the championship. He returned to Hong Kong in 2004 and worked as a model. In 2005, he became the first ever winner of Hong Kong's Mr. Hong Kong male beauty contest and subsequently signed a contract with TVB. Ko speaks fluent English, French, Cantonese and Mandarin.

Filmography

Songs

Music video appearances
2006: Vangie Tsang – "Remembrance" (紀念)
2006: Ivana Wong – "Thunder" (雷電)
2006: Toby Leung – "Bastard" (賤人)
2006: Niki Chow – "Welcoming Heartbreak" (迎接失戀)
2006: Rammie Guo – "Learning to Fly" (學會飛)
2006: Krusty – "Shopaholic" (戀物狂)
2008: Denise Ho – "Synchronized Swimming" (韻律泳)
2009: Kate Tsui – "Mind Reading (讀心術)

Awards
2003: The Sunshine Boyz Competition – 1st place
2005: Mr. Hong Kong; – 1st place
2005: Mr. Hong Kong – Stylish Award winner
2007: TVB Kids Songs Award – Top 10 Song ("Legend of the Dragon King")

References

External links
 
 Matthew Ko on Sina Weibo

|-
! colspan="3" style="background: #DAA520;" | Mr. Hong Kong
|-

Living people
1984 births
Hong Kong male television actors
Hong Kong emigrants to Canada
21st-century Hong Kong male actors